Royal Air Force Alness or more simply RAF Alness is a former Royal Air Force station located  southwest of Alness, Ross and Cromarty, Scotland and  north of Inverness, Inverness-shire.

History

RAF Alness was previously called RAF Invergordon until 10 February 1943.

The following units were based here at some point:
 No. 201 Squadron RAF
 No. 209 Squadron RAF
 No. 210 Squadron RAF
 No. 228 Squadron RAF
 No. 240 Squadron RAF
 No. 4 (Coastal) Operational Training Unit RAF (June 1941 - August 1946)
 No. 5 Flying Boat Servicing Unit RAF (November 1942 - 1945)
 No. 6 Air/Sea Rescue Marine Craft Unit RAF
 No. 302 Ferry Training Unit RAF (July 1945 - April 1946)
 No. 1100 Marine Craft Unit RAF
 Detachment of Coastal Command Flying Instructors School RAF (July - October 1945)
 Flying Boat Development Flight RAF (July 1924)
 Seaplane Training Squadron RAF (September 1939 - March 1941) absorbed into No. 4 (C)OTU

Current use
The site is now Alness Point Business Park.

See also
 List of former Royal Air Force stations

References

Citations

Bibliography

Royal Air Force stations of World War II in the United Kingdom
Royal Air Force stations in Scotland
RAF
Defunct airports in Scotland
Airports established in 1920